The 2010–11 Hong Kong League Cup is the 10th edition of the Hong Kong League Cup. The competition is back after a one-year absence, last played in 2008–09.

Sun Hei known as Convoy Sun Hei back in 2009 were set to defend their championship but went out in the first round.

Calendar

Bracket

First round

Quarter-finals

Semi-finals

Final

Scorers
The scorers in the 2010–11 Hong Kong League Cup are as follows:

2 goals

 Cheng Lai Hin (South China)
 Jordi Tarrés (Kitchee)
 Itaparica (TSW Pegasus)
 Mateja Kežman (South China)

1 goal

 Bai He (South China)
 Xu Deshuai (South China)
 Leung Chun Pong (South China)
 Kwok Kin Pong (South China)
 Wellingsson de Souza (South China)
 Leandro Carrijo (South China)
 Giovane (South China)
 Nicky Butt (South China)
 Gao Wen (Kitchee)
 Lam Ka Wai (Kitchee)
 Chan Man Fai (Kitchee)
 Roberto Losada (Kitchee)
 James Ha (Hong Kong FC)
 Jaimes Mckee (Hong Kong FC)
 Gergely Ghéczy (Hong Kong FC)
 Chow Cheuk Fung (Tuen Mun)
 To Hon To (NT Realty Wofoo Tai Po)
 Gerard Ambassa Guy (TSW Pegasus)
 Chan Ming Kong (TSW Pegasus)
 Godfred Karikari (TSW Pegasus)
 Lee Hong Lim (TSW Pegasus)
 Cahe (Sun Hei)
 Jean-Jacques Kilama (Fourway Rangers)
 Roberto Fronza (Fourway Rangers)
 Makhosonke Bhengu (Fourway Rangers)
 Yan Minghao (Tai Chung)

External links
 Hong Kong League Cup - Hong Kong Football Association

2010–11 domestic association football cups
Lea
2010-11